Ransom 2 is the debut studio album by American record producer Mike Will Made It. It is the sequel to his 2014 mixtape Ransom, and was released on March 24, 2017. The album features guest appearances by Kendrick Lamar, Rae Sremmurd, Big Sean, Lil Wayne, YG, Pharrell Williams, 2 Chainz, Young Thug, Chief Keef, and others.

Background
On January 4, 2016, Mike Will Made It revealed the cover art for the project while also releasing the first song from the mixtape, titled "By Chance", featuring artists Rae Sremmurd. On January 15, 2016, Mike Will announced on his Twitter account that he would be releasing a song the next day. The following day, "Al Sharpton", featuring American rapper Future was released. On January 23, 2016, Mike Will took to Twitter once again to announce to his fans that Ransom 2 would be dropping the following Friday on January 29. However come Friday, Mike Will then announced that he had delayed the project in order to obtain a guest feature from long time collaborator Gucci Mane, and also have him host the tape. At that point, Gucci Mane was still serving a three-month prison sentence and the police wouldn't allow him to host the mixtape. This meant working with Gucci Mane wouldn't be possible until he was released from prison on May 26, 2016.

On November 15, 2016, Nicki Minaj released her own remix of the Mike Will-produced song "Black Beatles" via her SoundCloud titled "Black Barbies", which was also released commercially. The song peaked at number 65 on the Billboard Hot 100 and was also awarded the 49th spot on Rolling Stone editor Rob Sheffield's 50 best songs of the year.

On February 22, 2017, Mike Will revealed on his Twitter account that he was working on finalizing the album before announcing the release date although he teased it would be released in March 2017. Doing so, he also partially revealed the track listing with the previously released songs being absent from it.

Singles
The first single from the project, "Nothing Is Promised", with Barbadian singer Rihanna, was released on June 3, 2016. The song peaked at number 75 on the Billboard Hot 100 On March 3, 2017 Mike Will released the second official single from the project titled "Gucci On My". The song features guest appearances from 21 Savage, YG and Migos.

Track listing
Album credits adapted from album's liner notes.

Notes
  signifies an additional producer
  signifies a vocal producer
 "Gucci On My" features additional vocals from Reese Laflare and Kamaiyah
 "Outro" features additional vocals by Tyrina Lee

Sample credits
 "On the Come Up" contains an interpolation from "Night of The Flying Horses", written and performed by Osvaldo Golijov
 "Burnin" contains a sample from "Marijuana", written by Richell Bonner and Devon Wheatley and performed by Richie Spice

Personnel

Performers
 Big Sean – featured artist 
 Young Thug – featured artist 
 Lil Yachty – featured artist 
 21 Savage – featured artist 
 YG – featured artist 
 Migos – featured artist 
 Fortune – featured artist 
 Kendrick Lamar – featured artist 
 Gucci Mane – featured artist 
 Rae Sremmurd – featured artist 
 Future – featured artist 
 Swae Lee – featured artist 
 Andrea – featured artist 
 2 Chainz – featured artist 
 Pharrell Williams – featured artist 
 Eearz – featured artist 
 Trouble – featured artist 
 Problem – featured artist 
 Lil Wayne – featured artist 
 HoodyBaby – featured artist 
 Chief Keef – featured artist 
 Rihanna – featured artist 

Technical
 Gregg Rominiecki – recording engineer 
 Maximilian – recording engineer 
 Jaycen Joshua – mixing engineer 
 Dave Kutch – mastering engineer 
 Matheis "Staffa" Carter – recording engineer 
 Steve Hybicki – mixing engineer , recording engineer 
 Cyrus "Nois" Taghipour – recording engineer 
 Mark "Mrii" Rudd – recording engineer 
 Swae Lee – recording engineer 
 Randy Lanphear – recording engineer 
 Jay Sremm – recording engineer 
 Sean Payne – recording engineer 
 Matt Schaeffer – recording engineer 
 Seth Firkins – recording engineer 
 Desmond Barner – recording engineer 
 BJ Burton – mixing engineer 
 Finis "KY" White – recording engineer 
 Mike Larson – recording engineer 
 30 Roc – recording engineer 
 Shawty Fresh – recording engineer 
 Stephen McDowell – recording engineer 
 Jeff Edwards – recording engineer 
 Brandon Wood – recording engineer 
 Marcos – recording engineer 
 Jasiah "Spydasmix" Posey – assistance mixing engineer 

Production
 Mike Will Made It – producer 
 Marz – producer 
 Resource – additional producer , producer 
 DJ Fu – producer 
 S1 – producer 
 Micah Weston – producer 
 30 Roc – producer 
 Ez Elpee – producer 
 Ducko McFli – producer 
 GT – producer 
 Pluss – producer 
 Kuk Harrell – vocal producer 

Managerial
 Mike Will Made It – executive producer
 Steve "The Sauce" Hybicki – executive producer
 The Eardrummers – executive producer
 DJ Mormile – management
 Jeremey "Migo The Plug" Ellis – management
 Vinny Kumar – legal
 Aubrey "Aubz" Potter – A&R
 Asheton "Pluss" Hogan – A&R
 Joey "F1JO" Antney – A&R, marketing
 Rashad "Shoddy" Brown – A&R
 Brian "Bwrightous" Wright – marketing, creative director
 Nabil Elderkin – creative director, photography
 Markeidric Walker – art & design
 Irwan Awalludin – art & design
 Manny Smith – A&R
 Gabrielle Graham – A&R coordinator
 Nicole Bilzerian – marketing
 Archie Davis – marketing
 Alicia Graham – A&R admin
 Kam Sangha – production
 Michelle An – creative
 Mark Bridges – creative
 Gary Kelly – revenue
 Tracy Kies – business affairs
 Todd "The Big Dance" Douglas – business affairs
 Ray Alba – publicity
 Aura Harewood – digital marketing

Charts

References

2017 debut albums
Albums produced by Mike Will Made It
Albums produced by Symbolyc One
Sequel albums
Mike Will Made It albums